The 2nd (Rawalpindi) Division was a regular army division of the British Indian Army. It was formed in 1903 after the Kitchener reforms of the Indian Army. During World War I it remained in India for local defence but it was mobilised for action on the North West Frontier on several occasions during the period.  The Division was mobilised in 1919 for service during the Third Afghan War.

Formation in August 1914

Sialkot (2nd) Cavalry Brigade
17th Lancers
6th King Edward's Own Cavalry
19th Lancers

Abbottabad (3rd) Brigade

1st Battalion, 5th Gurkha Rifles
2nd Battalion, 5th Gurkha Rifles
1st Battalion, 6th Gurkha Rifles
2nd Battalion, 6th Gurkha Rifles
68th, 94th and 104th Companies, Royal Garrison Artillery 
VII Brigade, Royal Field Artillery 
4th, 38th and 78th Batteries, RFA

Rawalpindi (4th) Brigade
21st Lancers
5th Cavalry
35th Sikhs
84th Punjabis
9 Mountain Battery, RGA 
W Battery, Royal Horse Artillery 
II Mountain Brigade, RGA
1st and 6th Mountain Batteries, RGA

Jhelum (5th) Brigade
21st Cavalry
37th Dogras
69th Punjabis
76th Punjabis
87th Punjabis

Unbrigaded
32nd Pioneers (at Sialkot)
1st Battalion, Green Howards
4th Battalion, King's Royal Rifle Corps 
2nd Battalion, Rifle Brigade
2nd Battalion, North Staffordshire Regiment (at Murree)
I Mountain Brigade, Indian Mountain Artillery (at Abbotabad)
27th and 30th Mountain Batteries, IMA
V Mountain Brigade, IMA
23rd, 28th and 29th Mountain Batteries, IMA

See also

 List of Indian divisions in World War I

References

Bibliography

External links

Indian World War I divisions
Military units and formations established in 1903
British Indian Army divisions